The 2007 All-Pacific-10 Conference football team consists of American football players chosen by various organizations for All-Pacific-10 Conference teams for the 2007 college football season. The USC Trojans won the conference, posting a 7–2 conference record. USC then beat the Illinois Fighting Illini in the Rose Bowl 49 to 17. Oregon quarterback Dennis Dixon was unanimously voted Pac-10 Offensive Player of the Year. USC defensive tackle Sedrick Ellis was voted Pat Tillman Pac-10 Defensive Player of the Year.

Offensive selections

Quarterbacks
Dennis Dixon, Oregon (Coaches-1)
Alex Brink, Washington St. (Coaches-2)

Running backs
Jonathan Stewart#, Oregon (Coaches-1)
Justin Forsett, California (Coaches-1)
Yvenson Bernard, Oregon St. (Coaches-2)
Louis Rankin, Washington (Coaches-2)

Wide receivers
Mike Thomas, Arizona (Coaches-1)
Brandon Gibson, Washington St. (Coaches-1)
DeSean Jackson, California (Coaches-2)
Lavelle Hawkins, California (Coaches-2)

Tight ends
Fred Davis, USC (Coaches-1)
Jed Collins, Washington St. (Coaches-2)

Tackles
Sam Baker, USC (Coaches-1)
Andy Levitre, Oregon St. (Coaches-2)
Eben Britton, Arizona (Coaches-2)
Fenuki Tupou, Oregon (Coaches-2)

Guards
Mike Pollak, Arizona St. (Coaches-1)
Roy Schuening, Oregon St. (Coaches-1)
Chilo Rachal, USC (Coaches-1)
Juan Garcia, Washington (Coaches-2)
Geoff Schwartz, Oregon (Coaches-2)

Centers
Alex Mack#, California (Coaches-1)
Max Unger, Oregon (Coaches-1)

Defensive selections

Ends
Lawrence Jackson, USC (Coaches-1)
Dorian Smith, Oregon St. (Coaches-1)
Nick Reed, Oregon (Coaches-1)
Dexter Davis, Arizona St. (Coaches-2)
Bruce Davis, UCLA (Coaches-2)
Jeff Van Orsow, Oregon St (Coaches-2)

Tackles
Sedrick Ellis#, USC (Coaches-1)
Lionel Dotson, Arizona (Coaches-2)

Linebackers
Keith Rivers, USC (Coaches-1)
Rey Maualuga,  USC (Coaches-1)
Robert James, Arizona St. (Coaches-1)
Joey LaRocque, Oregon St. (Coaches-2)
Alan Darlin, Oregon St. (Coaches-2)
Derrick Doggett, Oregon St. (Coaches-2)
Zack Follett, California (Coaches-2)

Cornerbacks
Antoine Cason, Arizona (Coaches-1)
Brandon Hughes, Oregon St. (Coaches-2)
Justin Tryon, Arizona St. (Coaches-2)
Terrell Thomas, USC (Coaches-2)

Safeties
Kevin Ellison, USC (Coaches-1)
Patrick Chung, Oregon (Coaches-1)
Chris Horton, UCLA (Coaches-1)
Troy Nolan, Arizona St. (Coaches-2)

Special teams

Placekickers
Thomas Weber, Arizona St. (Coaches-1)
Alexis Serna, Oregon St. (Coaches-2)

Punters
Keenyn Crier, Arizona (Coaches-1)
Jay Ottovegio, Stanford (Coaches-2)

Return specialists 
Matthew Slater, UCLA (Coaches-1)
Kyle Williams, Arizona St. (Coaches-1)
Jonathan Stewart, Oregon (Coaches-2)
DeSean Jackson, California (Coaches-2)

Special teams player
Jahvid Best, California (Coaches-1)
Wopamo Osaisai, Stanford (Coaches-2)

Key
Coaches = selected by Pac-12 coaches

# = unanimous selection by coaches

See also
2007 College Football All-America Team

References

All-Pacific-10 Conference Football Team
All-Pac-12 Conference football teams